Foy Provincial Park is a provincial park on Round Lake in Ontario, Canada. Since it is non-operational, camping is prohibited, but day-use activities such as swimming and hiking are permitted. The park property includes facilities used by the Ontario Ranger program of the Ministry of Natural Resources.

History
Purchased in 1968, the Foy property was originally an addition to Bonnechere Provincial Park, which is also located on Round Lake. As day use at Bonnechere Park became heavy in the early 1980s, the idea of creating another park on Round Lake was introduced. In 1985, it was put into regulation as Foy Provincial Park and designated as "recreation"-class. The stated goal of the park was to "maintain quality summer-oriented day use facilities."

Citing declining attendance, the Ministry of Natural Resources closed the day use facilities at Foy in 1994, along with seven other Ontario provincial parks.

For many years the Round Lake Ontario Ranger Program operated out of Foy park.  The Ontario Ranger Program was suddenly cancelled completely by the Liberal Government in 2012.

Ecology
The 1986 management plan called for two nature reserve zones, one on the west side of the park's point to protect a "wave cut terrace that is the evidence of a glacial lake's existence." On the east side of the point, exposed clay made up the other reserve zone.

Gallery

See also
List of Ontario parks

Notes

External links

Parks in Renfrew County
Provincial parks of Ontario
Protected areas established in 1985
1985 establishments in Ontario